Drake Berehowsky (born January 3, 1972) is a Canadian former professional ice hockey defenceman.  He is best known for his time in the National Hockey League (NHL), where he played for the Toronto Maple Leafs, Pittsburgh Penguins, Edmonton Oilers, Nashville Predators, Vancouver Canucks and Phoenix Coyotes.

He is the former head coach of the Orlando Solar Bears of the ECHL. He had two stints as the team's head coach, first coaching the Solar Bears during the 2012–13 season. Following the 2021-22 season, the Solar Bears and Berehowsky mutually agreed to part ways.

Playing career
As a youth, Berehowsky played in the 1985 Quebec International Pee-Wee Hockey Tournament with the Toronto Marlboros minor ice hockey team.

Berehowsky began his junior hockey career with the Kingston Raiders of the Ontario Hockey League (OHL) in 1988 and had a strong rookie season, earning 46 points in 63 games. The Raiders were renamed to the Kingston Frontenacs in 1989–90. Berehowsky would only appear in nine games as he suffered a serious knee injury. He earned 14 points in those nine games and the Toronto Maple Leafs would draft Berehowsky with their first round draft pick in the 1990 NHL Entry Draft. Berehowsky split the 1990–91 season between the Frontenacs and the North Bay Centennials before earning a late season call-up to the Leafs.  He returned to North Bay for the 1991–92 season, recording 82 points in 62 games, helping the Centennials to the OHL finals, tallying 31 points in 21 post-season games. Berehowsky would earn another late season call-up to Toronto, appearing in a single game, before being sent to the St. John's Maple Leafs for the 1992 American Hockey League (AHL) playoffs, where he recorded five assists in six games.

Berehowsky split the 1992–93 and 1993–94 seasons between St. John's and Toronto before earning a full-time roster spot in Toronto in the 1994–95 season.  Berehowsky appeared in 25 games with the Maple Leafs in 1994–95. On April 7, 1995, the team traded him to the Pittsburgh Penguins for Grant Jennings.  Berehowsky would finish the season as the odd man out on the Penguins defense, as he appeared in only four regular season games and one playoff game with the team. In 1995–96, Pittsburgh sent Berehowsky to the Cleveland Lumberjacks, their AHL affiliate, for most of the season and he would only appear in one game with the Penguins.  After the season, Berehowsky became a free agent.

He split the 1996–97 season between the Carolina Monarchs of the AHL and the San Antonio Dragons of the International Hockey League until signing an NHL contract with the Edmonton Oilers on September 30, 1997.  Berehowsky spent most of the season with the Oilers, appearing in 67 regular season and 12 post-season games with the club. However, he did see some time with the Hamilton Bulldogs of the AHL, playing in eight games.

On October 1, 1998, the Oilers traded Berehowsky, Éric Fichaud and Greg de Vries to the Nashville Predators for Mikhail Shtalenkov and Jim Dowd. Berehowsky played with the Predators until 2001, having a career season in 1999–2000 when he scored 12 goals and 32 points, leading the Nashville defense in goals. On March 9, 2001, the Predators dealt Berehowsky to the Vancouver Canucks.

Berehowsky's time with the Canucks was short, as he would once again be traded on December 28, 2001, with Denis Pederson to the Phoenix Coyotes for Todd Warriner, Trevor Letowski and Tyler Bouck.  Berehowsky saw regular time on the Coyotes blueline, helping them to the post-season.  An injury suffered in training camp sidelined Berehowsky for most of the 2002–03 season, as he only appeared in seven games with Phoenix, and two with the Springfield Falcons of the AHL before becoming a free agent at the end of the season.

On August 29, 2003, he signed with the Pittsburgh Penguins, where he had played from 1994 to 1996. Berehowsky played in 47 more games with the Penguins. On February 11, 2004, the Penguins traded Berehowsky to his original NHL team, the Toronto Maple Leafs for Ric Jackman, where he finished out the season.

With the NHL in a lockout for the 2004–05 season, Berehowsky signed with Skellefteå AIK in Sweden for the season, before signing a contract with Eisbären Berlin in Germany for the 2005–06 season. After the season with Berlin, Berehowsky returned to North America, where he signed with the San Antonio Rampage of the AHL, before retiring from hockey in the summer of 2006.

Coaching career
After his NHL career, Berehowsky served as an assistant coach with the Peoria Rivermen of the AHL for three seasons. On June 19, 2012, Berehowsky was named head coach of the Orlando Solar Bears for their inaugural season in the ECHL. In the 2012–13 season, Berehowsky lead the expansion team to a record of 28 wins, 37 losses, 3 overtime losses, and 4 shootout losses totaling 63 points; second to last place in the 14-team Eastern Conference, with only three teams finishing with fewer points in the then 23-team league.

Global Lethbridge's Paul Kingsmith announced June 4, 2013, Berehowsky was to be the next head coach for the Lethbridge Hurricanes of the Western Hockey League (WHL). During his first season with the club, the Berehowsky-led Hurricanes finished with 16 fewer wins and 37 fewer points than the previous season. The team missed the playoffs for the fifth consecutive season and set the franchise record for fewest wins (12) and fewest points (29) in the 26 season Lethbridge Hurricanes' history as well as the 47 year franchise history. On December 9, 2014, Berehowsky was fired from his coaching duties with the struggling Hurricanes.

He then joined the Sudbury Wolves of the Ontario Hockey League as an associate coach in 2015. On November 14, 2016, Berehowsky left the Wolves to return to Orlando for a second stint as head coach of the Solar Bears.

Head coach record

Career statistics

References

External links

1972 births
Barrie Colts players
Canadian expatriate ice hockey players in Germany
Canadian expatriate ice hockey players in Sweden
Canadian ice hockey coaches
Canadian ice hockey defencemen
Carolina Monarchs players
Cleveland Lumberjacks players
ECHL coaches
Edmonton Oilers players
Eisbären Berlin players
Hamilton Bulldogs (AHL) players
Ice hockey people from Toronto
Kingston Frontenacs players
Kingston Raiders players
Lethbridge Hurricanes coaches
Living people
Nashville Predators players
National Hockey League first-round draft picks
North Bay Centennials players
Phoenix Coyotes players
Pittsburgh Penguins players
St. John's Maple Leafs players
San Antonio Dragons players
San Antonio Rampage players
Skellefteå AIK players
Springfield Falcons players
Toronto Maple Leafs draft picks
Toronto Maple Leafs players
Vancouver Canucks players